Heviin boov is a traditional Mongolian biscuit assembled in layers. The number of layers in the cake represents the status of the family. The individual biscuits are stamped with a wooden block that imprints a design unique to the family, passed down through generations. It is traditionally served with aaruul in between the layers or on top.

Terminology
Ul boov means "shoe soles" in English language, not to be confused with the French pastry palmier, which is also known as "shoe soles" in the cuisine of the Southern United States.

History 
Ul boov is prepared by Mongolians for the Mongolian lunar new year, Tsagaan Sar. Tsagaan Sar is a lavish feast, requiring preparation days in advance, as the men and women make large quantities of buuz as a whole family, along with ul boov, a pastry reserved for both dessert and presentation. During Mongolia's Communist period, the government banned Tsagaan Sar after Choibalsan's death in 1952 and tried to replace it with a holiday called "Collective Herder's Day", but the holiday was practiced again after the 1990 Democratic Revolution in Mongolia.

Preparation

See also 
 List of cakes
 Mongolian cuisine
 Tsagaan Sar

References

External links
 

Mongolian cuisine
New Year in Mongolia
New Year foods
Biscuits